Francisco Llácer Pla (1918 in Valencia – 2002 in Valencia) was a Spanish composer and choral conductor. He was one of the first Valencian composers who assimilated the postwar avantgarde approaches, combining it with lyricism and echoes of the Valencian folklore. Tomás Marco wrote: Llácer Pla offers a new, suggestive vision of a form of musical nationalism from a new, progressive perspective. A professor at the Valencia Conservatory, several of his progressive works are based in his harmonic investigations, such as his concept of heptafonism and his theory of the "balanced chord", based on the double sense of the sonorous bodies' resonance.

On October 7, 2005 he was named Valencia's favorite son.

Quotes

Incomplete list of works

References

Llacer Pla, Francisco
Llacer Pla, Francisco
1918 births
2002 deaths
20th-century Spanish musicians
20th-century Spanish male musicians
20th-century classical composers